Light from Light is a 2019 American drama written and directed by Paul Harrill and starring Marin Ireland, Jim Gaffigan, Josh Wiggins, Atheena Frizzell and David Cale.

Plot
Single mother Shelia (Marin Ireland), who is also raising her adolescent son Owen (Josh Wiggins), works at a car rental service counter. After her appearance on a local radio program, she's contacted about Richard (Jim Gaffigan), a recent widower who thinks his wife may be haunting his East Tennessee farmhouse. Agreeing to help, Shelia brings along Owen and his classmate Lucy (Atheena Frizzell) in hopes of understanding the mystery.

Cast
Marin Ireland as Shelia
Jim Gaffigan as Richard
Josh Wiggins as Owen
Atheena Frizzell as Lucy
David Cale as Father Martin

Production
The film was shot in Knoxville, Tennessee in July and August 2018.

Reception
The website's critics consensus reads: "A paranormally tinged drama with a deceptively gentle touch, Light from Light sinks its hooks into the audience gradually but isn't quick to let go."

References

External links
 
 

American drama films
Films shot in Tennessee
2010s English-language films
2010s American films